Astroblepus simonsii is a species of catfish of the family Astroblepidae. It can be found in Peru. 

Named in honor of the American natural history collector in South America, Perry O. Simons (1869-1901), who collected the type specimen. Later his guide murdered him while crossing the Andes of Argentina, presumably for his money and gear.

References

Bibliography
Eschmeyer, William N., ed. 1998. Catalog of Fishes. Special Publication of the Center for Biodiversity Research and Information, num. 1, vol. 1–3. California Academy of Sciences. San Francisco, California, United States. 2905. .

Astroblepus
Taxa named by Charles Tate Regan
Fish described in 1904
Freshwater fish of Peru
Catfish of South America